Northumberland County Cricket Club was established in December 1895. It has since played minor counties cricket from 1896 and played List A cricket from 1971 to 2005, using a different number of home grounds during that time. Their first home minor counties fixture in 1896 was against Staffordshire at Northumberland Club Ground, Heaton, while their first List A match came 75 years later against Lincolnshire in the 1971 Gillette Cup at Osborne Avenue, Jesmond. During the time Northumberland were permitted to play List A cricket, Osborne Avenue played host to all its home fixtures in that format.

The eight grounds that Northumberland have used for home matches since 1896 are listed below, with statistics complete through to the end of the 2014 season.

Grounds

List A
Below is a complete list of grounds used by Northumberland County Cricket Club when it was permitted to play List A matches. These grounds have also held Minor Counties Championship and MCCA Knockout Trophy matches.

Minor Counties
Below is a complete list of grounds used by Northumberland County Cricket Club in Minor Counties Championship and MCCA Knockout Trophy matches.

Notes

References

Northumberland County Cricket Club
Cricket grounds in Northumberland
Northumberland